is a district in the Farsta borough of southern Stockholm.

The area was largely developed in the 1950s and 1960, with the building of a number of apartment blocks. In 1969 the shopping centre  was built, consisting of small number of shops around an open square. The local library is found here, along with a small supermarket, a newsagents and a bar.

The area is largely residential, though broken up by green spaces, wooded areas and footpaths and cycleways. Close by is the lake , with a walking trail around the edge, and the  conservation area.

References

Districts of Stockholm